Andrew Lambert  (born 31 December 1956) is a British naval historian, who since 2001 has been the Laughton Professor of Naval History in the Department of War Studies, King's College London.

Academic career
After completing his doctoral research, Lambert was lecturer in modern international history at Bristol Polytechnic from 1983 until 1987; consultant in the Department of History and International Affairs at the Royal Naval College, Greenwich, from 1987 until 1989; senior lecturer in war studies at the Royal Military Academy Sandhurst, from 1989 until 1991; senior lecturer in the Department of War Studies at King's College London from 1996 until 1999, then professor of naval history, from 1999 until 2001; and then Laughton Professor of Naval History, and Director of the Laughton Unit.

He served as Honorary Secretary of the Navy Records Society
from 1996 until 2005 and is a Fellow of the Royal Historical Society.

Lambert's work focuses on the naval and strategic history of the British Empire between the Napoleonic Wars and the First World War, and the early development of naval historical writing. His work has addressed a range of issues, including technology, policy-making, regional security, deterrence, historiography, crisis-management and conflict.

He has lectured on aspects of his work in Australia, Canada, Finland, Denmark and Russia. In addition, he wrote and presented for the BBC the television series War at Sea in 2004.

On 1 May 2014 he was awarded the Anderson Medal by the Society for Nautical Research for his book The Challenge: Britain against America in the Naval War of 1812 (Faber and Faber 2012).

Books
 Battleships in Transition: the Creation of the Steam Battlefleet, 1815–1860, Conway Maritime Press (1984) 
 Warrior: the World's First Ironclad, Then and Now, Conway Maritime Press (1987)  
 The Crimean War: British Grand Strategy against Russia, 1853 – 1856, Manchester University Press (1990) 
 The Last Sailing Battlefleet: Maintaining Naval Mastery 1815 – 1850, Conway Maritime Press (1991) 
 Steam, Steel and Shellfire: the Steam Warship 1815–1906, edited by Andrew Lambert, Conway Maritime Press (1991) 
 The Crimean War: the War Correspondents, edited by Andrew Lambert and Stephen Badsey, Sutton Publishing (1994) 
 The Foundations of Naval History: Sir John Laughton, the Royal Navy and the Historical Profession, Chatham Publishing (1998) 
 War at Sea in the Age of Sail, Weidenfeld & Nicolson (2000) 
 Laughton's Legacy : Naval History at King's College London Inaugural Lecture (2002)
 Trincomalee: the Last of Nelson's Frigates, Chatham Publishing (2002) 
 Letters and Papers of Professor Sir John Knox Laughton, 1830–1915 Routledge (2002) 
 The Naval History of Great Britain During the French Revolutionary and Napoleonic Wars by William James with a new introductions by Andrew Lambert. (2002)
 Nelson: Britannia's God of War, Faber and Faber (2004) 
 Portsmouth Dockyard in the Age of Nelson: Transactions of the Naval Dockyards Society Volume 1, Naval Dockyards Society (2006) 
 Admirals: The Naval Commanders who made Britain Great, Faber and Faber (2008) 
 Ship: A History in Art & Photography, Conway Publishing (2010) 
 Franklin: Tragic Hero of Polar Navigation, Faber and Faber (2010) 
 The Challenge: Britain Against America in the Naval War of 1812, Faber and Faber (2012) 
 Crusoe's Island: A Rich and Curious History of Pirates, Castaways and Madness, Faber and Faber (2016) 
 Seapower States: Maritime Culture, Continental Empires and the Conflict That Made the Modern World, Yale University Press (2018) 
 The Crimean War: British Grand Strategy against Russia, 1853–56, Routledge (2020) 
 Letters and Papers of Professor Sir John Knox Laughton, 1830-1915 (Navy Records Society Publications), Routledge (2021), 
 Favourite of Fortune: Captain John Quilliam, Trafalgar Hero (with Andrew Bond and Frank Cowin), Seaforth Publishing (2021) 
 The British Way of War: Julian Corbett and the Battle for a National Strategy, Yale University Press (2021)

Articles
 "Preparing for the Russian War: British Strategy; March 1853 – March 1854.", War & Society (1989)
 "The Naval War" in Pimlott, J.L. & Badsey, S. Eds. The Gulf War Assessed (London, 1992)
 "Aland, Bomarsund and Anglo-Russian Relations 1815–1854" in Ericsson, K. & Montin, K. eds. I Vedlast Over Skiftet Och Alands Hav (Abo, 1993)
 "Seapower 1939–40: Churchill and the Strategic Origins of the Battle of the Atlantic", Journal of Strategic Studies (March 1994)
 "Part of a Long Line of Circumvallation to Confine the Future Expansion of Russia: Great Britain and the Baltic 1809 – 1895", in Rystad, Bohme & Carlgren Eds. In Quest of Trade and Security: The Baltic in Power Politics, 1500- 1990 (Lund University, Sweden, 1994)
 "The Shield of Empire (1815–1895)" in J. R. Hill. Ed. The Oxford Illustrated History of the Royal Navy (Oxford, 1995)
 "The Royal Navy 1856–1914: Deterrence and the Strategy of World Power" in Neilson, K. & Errington, J. Navies and Global Defense: Theories and Strategies (London, 1996)
 "Empire and Seapower: Shipbuilding by the East India Company at Bombay for the Royal Navy 1805–1850" in Les Flottes Des Compagnes des Indes 1600–1857 (Paris, 1996)
 "Politics, Technology and Policy-Making, 1859–1865: Palmerston, Gladstone and the Management of the Ironclad Naval Race" in The Northern Mariner vol. VIII (July 1998) pp. 9–38
 "Responding to the Nineteenth Century: the Royal Navy and the Introduction of the Screw Propeller", History of Technology (1999)
 "Admiral Sir William Cornwallis" in Le Fevre & Harding, eds., The Precursors of Nelson (London, 2000)
 "Under the heel of Britannia, the Bombardment of Sweaborg 8–10 August 1855" and "The Syrian Campaign, 1814" in Capt. P. Hore RN ed. Seapower Ashore: 200 Years of Royal Navy Operations on Land (London, 2001)
 "The Principal Source of Understanding: Navies and the Educational Role of the Past" in Capt. P. Hore, RN, ed., The Hudson Papers Volume 1. (London: Ministry of Defence, 2001)
 "Australia, the Trent Crisis of 1861 and the strategy of imperial defence" in Stevens, D. & Reeve, J., eds. Southern Trident: Strategy, History and the rise of Australian Naval Power (Sydney, Allen & Unwin, 2001)
 "Introduction" and "The Slide into War" in Gardiner, Robert, ed. The Naval War of 1812 (London, Caxton Editions, 2001)
 "General Introduction" and "Introduction Part 2" in James, W. M., The Naval History of Great Britain, During the French Revolutionary and Napoleonic Wars: Volume 2, 1797–1799 (London, Conway Maritime Press, 2002)
 "Winning without Fighting: British Grand Strategy and its Application to the United States, 1815–65" in Lee, Bradford A. & Walling, Karl F., eds. Strategic Logic and Political Rationality (London, Frank Cass, 2003)
 "Introduction" in James, William, Naval Occurrences of The War of 1812 (London, Conway Maritime Press, 2004)

and numerous others.

References
Notes

Bibliography
 
 

1956 births
Academics of King's College London
Academics of the University of the West of England, Bristol
Alumni of King's College London
English naval historians
Fellows of the Royal Historical Society
Living people